The Calico surfperch (Amphistichus koelzi) is a species of surfperch native to the eastern Pacific Ocean. They are primarily found along the west coast of the United States (California, Oregon, and Washington). The specific name honours the American fisheries biologist Walter Koelz (1895-1989).

According to the California Department of Fish and Game, Calico surfperch are distinguished from other surfperches by a noticeable notch between the dorsal soft and hard rays. Further, the dorsal hard and soft rays are of equal length and sides often have broken bars and spots on each side. The usual length is around 30 cm (12 inches).

References

Calico surfperch
Fish of Mexican Pacific coast
Taxa named by Carl Leavitt Hubbs
Calico surfperch